Saprae Creek is a hamlet in northern Alberta, Canada within the Regional Municipality (RM) of Wood Buffalo.

2016 wildfire
 
On May 4, 2016, the hamlet was evacuated due to the growing fire to the southwest near the Fort McMurray International Airport. By May 5 severe damage was reported to 30% of buildings.

Demographics 

The population of Saprae Creek according to the 2018 municipal census conducted by the Regional Municipality of Wood Buffalo is 715, a decrease from its 2012 municipal census population count of 925.

See also 
List of communities in Alberta
List of designated places in Alberta
List of hamlets in Alberta

References 

Hamlets in Alberta
Designated places in Alberta
Regional Municipality of Wood Buffalo